Hirtshals is a town and seaport on the coast of Skagerrak on the island of Vendsyssel-Thy at the top of the Jutland peninsula in northern Denmark, Europe. It is located in Hjørring municipality in Region Nordjylland. The town of Hirtshals has a population of 5,532 (1 January 2022). Located on the Skagerrak, it is especially known for its fishing and ferry harbours.

History 

The town of Hirtshals developed around the artificial harbour which was constructed between 1919 and 1931. In 1925, the Hjørring-Hirtshals railway line opened to link the port of Hirtshals with the Danish rail network. In 1966, the harbour was expanded and became one of the largest fishing ports in Denmark. On September 8 1989 Partnair flight 394 crashed off the coast of Hirtshals killing all 55 passengers on board.   

Until 1 January 2007, Hirtshals was also the seat of Hirtshals Municipality which was merged with existing Hjørring, Løkken-Vrå, and Sindal municipalities to form an enlarged Hjørring Municipality.

Geography 

Hirtshals is located on the sand and clay promontory Hirtshals, overlooking the Skagerrak between the Jammer Bay and the Tannis Bay. The shoreline is backed by low cliffs, beneath which is a narrow and rocky beach.

Cityscape 

The town's 35-metre-high lighthouse, Hirtshals fyr, is a local landmark.  Building was begun on 28 June 1860, and it was first lit on 1 January 1863.  It is constructed of red brick and covered with Dutch tile.

Climate 

The sea level has been as high as 1 metre over the norm. But in days where there is no wind, the waves typically will not be higher than maximum  over normal sea level.

Due to the proximity of the town to the coast, sea fog is not an uncommon occurrence. In the winter, the air temperature can fall as low as 1.6 degrees, but in the summer, it can reach over 25 degrees Celsius.

Waves 

Hirtshals Havnekontor (Hirtshals' Harbour Office) keeps track of wave periods. Annual wave periods fluctuate between half a second, up to about 9 seconds. According to Hirtshals Havnekontor (Hirtshals' Harbour Office) normal wave heights are between 2 and 2.5 metres.

Wind 

The prevailing wind in Hirtshals is to the south or south-west. Wind speeds vary all year long, usually topping at 10 m/s during the winter.

Economy 

Fishing plays a big role for the town and its inhabitants, as does tourism and the renting of summer homes.
Due to the ferry connections with Norway, the shops in Hirtshals thrive on the large number of visitors, especially Norwegians, who shop in the small town all year long.

Culture 
It is the home of one of the largest aquariums in Europe, the Nordsøen Oceanarium.  This was built in 1984 as Nordsømuseet, The North Sea Museum, and got its present name after it was extended in 1998 to include a fish tank containing 4.5 million litres of water, making it the largest in northern Europe. The Oceanarium has 70 different species in its collection. A fire in December 2003 destroyed the new extension, but it was rebuilt and reopened on 22 July 2005.

The 2014 Danish film The Sunfish is set in Hirtshals.

Transportation

Port of Hirtshals 

Hirtshals is the Danish terminal for the services of the Norwegian ferry company, Color Line. Each year thousands of tourists travel back and forth between Hirtshals and the Norwegian cities of Kristiansand and Larvik. Previously, Color Line also offered services to Bergen, Stavanger and Oslo, but decided to stop operating these routes in early 2008. Another ferry operator, Fjord Line, now operates a route to Bergen, Stavanger, Kristiansand and Langesund. It has also been possible since autumn 2010 to travel to Tórshavn in the Faroe Islands and to Seyðisfjörður in Iceland with Smyril Line. The port has LNG facilities for the ferries, and hosts the first wind farm built without subsidies.

Railway stations
The Hirtshals railway line connects Hirtshals with Hjørring and the rest of the Danish rail network. Hirtshals railway station is the principal railway station of the town. The town is also served by the railway halts Lilleheden and Emmersbæk.

Notable people

 Niels Hausgaard (born 1944 in Hirtshals) singer, songwriter and comedian
 Kim Lynge Pedersen (born 1965 in Hirtshals) a Danish weightlifter, competed in the 1992 Summer Olympics
 Lene Espersen (born 1965 in Hirtshals) former politician, Deputy Prime Minister 2008/2011
 Louise Jensen (1971 in Hirtshals – 1994) a tour guide working in Cyprus, murdered by three British soldiers 
 Simon Mathew (born 1984 in Hirtshals) pop singer
 Dodo and the Dodos (begun in 1986) pop band on Danish radio stations in the 1980s
 Patrick Pedersen (born 1991 in Hirtshals) footballer, plays as a striker for Valur

Local radio
 Skaga FM, formerly known as Radio Hirtshals, is a local radio station that plays domestic and foreign hits from the 1980s, 1990s and onwards, and reports on current events happening within the municipality of Hjørring. MHz: 105.6 FM.
 Since the early year 2010, local ferry operator Color Line (serves two ferry routes between Hirtshals and Norway) have had their own radio station, Color Radio, that plays popular songs from mostly the 1980s and 1990s. It also gives passengers from Hirtshals to Norway information about the next departure, and when check-in closes. The radio can be heard all over Hirtshals town, and from the motorway roundabout near Aabyen at the E39. MHz: 95.3 FM.

External links

 Hjørring Municipality's official website 
 North Sea Museum
 Hirtshals local online newspaper

Links to Hirtshals Weather
Hirtshals Havnekontor Weathermeasurings, updates every minute (Only in metric)
DMI Hirtshals (Only in metric)'
Weather-Forecast.com Hirtshals (Metric & Imperial)

Webcams of Hirtshals Harbour
2 Webcams on Hirtshals Harbour
The first one on the page is Pier II, and the second is Frontbassin towards northeast.

References

 Municipal statistics: NetBorger Kommunefakta, delivered from KMD aka Kommunedata (Municipal Data)
 Municipal mergers and neighbors: Eniro new municipalities map

 
Cities and towns in the North Jutland Region
Port cities and towns in Denmark
Hjørring Municipality
Port cities and towns of the North Sea